Bue Fjermeros (1912–2000) was a Norwegian lawyer and politician.  He was the county governor of Nordland from 1951 until 1966 and then county governor of Vest-Agder from 1966 until his retirement in 1982.

References

1912 births
2000 deaths
County governors of Norway
County governors of Nordland